Pastor Terence Michos (born December 26, 1953) is an American actor. He is known for his role as Vermin in the 1979 film The Warriors.

Biography
Michos was born in Poughkeepsie, New York. He attended the American Academy of Dramatic Arts, appearing in Line, The New York City Street Show, and Grease. Michos is best known for playing the character Vermin in the cult film The Warriors (1979). His television acting credits were in Simon & Simon (1981) and McClain's Law (1982). Terence Michos later served as a news anchor for Cablevision in Wappinger, New York. Since 1997, he has taught public speaking courses in the New York Hudson Valley, and Marist College. He also served as the interim Senior Pastor at Peekskill Assembly of God in Peekskill, New York for nine years. He is now the Church Administrator of Faith Assembly of God Church in Poughkeepsie, New York.

Filmography

References

External links
 

1953 births
Living people
American male film actors
American male television actors
American people of Greek descent
20th-century American male actors
People from Poughkeepsie, New York
Wappinger, New York